Edward Charles Dancker (March 14, 1914 – October 3, 1991) was an American professional basketball player.

A 6'7" center who grew up in Milwaukee, Wisconsin, Dancker began his professional career in 1938 with the Sheboygan Red Skins of the National Basketball League (NBL). He averaged 7.8 points per game and served as the team captain. In 1948–49, Dancker played for the Oshkosh All-Stars. Dancker was a five-time NBL all-star and ranked fourth among all-time NBL scoring leaders.

References

External links
 Ed Dancker's professional career statistics

1914 births
1991 deaths
American men's basketball players
Basketball players from Milwaukee
Centers (basketball)
Oshkosh All-Stars players
Sheboygan Red Skins players
South Division High School alumni